was the 9th daimyō of Hirosaki Domain in northern Mutsu Province, Honshū, Japan (modern-day Aomori Prefecture). His courtesy title, initially Dewa-no-kami, was later raised to Saikyo Daiyu and Jujū, and his Court rank was Junior Fourth Rank, Lower Grade.

Biography
Tsugaru Yasuchika was the eldest son of Tsugaru Akitaka, the 5th lord of Kuroishi, a 4000-koku hatamoto holding created for the second son of Tsugaru Nobuhira, the 2nd daimyō of Hirosaki. Nobuhira was married to a daughter of Ishida Mitsunari; however, for political reasons after the establishment of the Tokugawa shogunate, he found it expedient to reduce her to concubine status and to marry an adopted daughter of Tokugawa Ieyasu instead. Nevertheless, the son of his first wife, Tsugaru Nobuyoshi remained his heir, which resulted in an O-Ie Sōdō by supporters of the son by his second wife, Tsugaru Nobufusa. The shogunate ruled in favour of Nobuyoshi, and the Kuroishi holding was created for Nobufusa and his descendants.

When Tsugaru Nobuakira, the 8th daimyō of Tsugaru Domain died without heir in 1791, Yasuchika was posthumously adopted into the main Tsugaru house as his successor, and the Kuroishi holding was turned over to his Yasuchika's eldest son. He was received in formal audience by shōgun Tokugawa Ienari the same year.

Yasuchika implemented many of the reforms initiated by Nobuakira to restore prosperity to the disaster-prone domain, including having many of his samurai turn to part-time farming to maintain their revenues. In 1796, he established a Domain academy called the Keikokan. The domain was struck by a large earthquake and tsunami in 1793.

In 1805, the Shogunate charged Tsugaru Domain with the responsibility of maintaining the security of a portion of Ezo, an area considered loosely at the time to encompass present-day Hokkaidō, Karafuto and the southern Kurile Islands. In return, the kokudaka of the domain were increased to 70,000  koku.  The kokudaka of the domain was further increased to 100,000 koku in 1808, and in 1809 Kuroishi was raised to a full han status. Yasuchika also received a promotion in court rank from Junior Fifth to Junior Fourth rank.

However, the increase in revenue was far less than the expense of dispatching troops and maintaining garrisons in the wide expanses of the northern islands, and increases in local taxation led to widespread peasant revolts by 1813. Yasuchika received a promotion in his courtesy title in 1820 to honorary chamberlain (Jujū).  The promotion incensed the samurai of Tsugaru's rivals, the Nanbu clan of Morioka Domain, which cumulated in the Sōma Daisaku Incident of 1821, in which a Nanbu samurai attempted to assassinate Yasuchika.

In 1825, Yasuchika turned rule of the domain over to his second son and went into retirement, spending his time writing haiku poetry.  He died at the domain's Edo residence in 1833. His grave is at the clan temple of Shinryō-in (a subsidiary of Kan'ei-ji) in Taitō-ku, Tokyo.

See also
Tsugaru clan

References 
 Koyasu Nobushige (1880). Buke kazoku meiyoden 武家家族名誉伝 Volume 1. Tokyo: Koyasu Nobushige. (Accessed from National Diet Library, July 17, 2008)
 Kurotaki, Jūjirō (1984). Tsugaru-han no hanzai to keibatsu 津軽藩の犯罪と刑罰. Hirosaki: Hoppō shinsha.
 Narita, Suegorō (1975). Tsugaru Tamenobu: shidan 津軽為信: 史談. Aomori: Tōō Nippōsha.
 Tsugaru Tsuguakira Kō Den kankōkai (1976). Tsugaru Tsuguakira kō-den 津輕承昭公傳. Tokyo: Rekishi Toshosha
 The content of much of this article was derived from that of the corresponding article on Japanese Wikipedia.

External links
 "Hirosaki-jō" (February 17, 2008)
 "Tsugaru-han" on Edo 300 HTML (February 17, 2008)

Tozama daimyo
Tsugaru clan
1765 births
1833 deaths
Hatamoto
People of Edo-period Japan